Kazimierz Błasiński (26 September 1926 – 5 July 2007) was a Polish rower. He competed in the men's coxless four event at the 1956 Summer Olympics.

References

1926 births
2007 deaths
Polish male rowers
Olympic rowers of Poland
Rowers at the 1956 Summer Olympics
People from Staszów County
Sportspeople from Świętokrzyskie Voivodeship